Icelandic Canadians are Canadian citizens of Icelandic ancestry or Iceland-born people who reside in Canada.

Canada has the largest ethnic Icelandic population outside Iceland, with about 101,795 people of full or partial Icelandic descent as of the Canada 2016 Census.  Many Icelandic Canadians are descendants of people who fled an eruption of the Icelandic volcano Askja in 1875.

History 

The history between Icelanders and North America dates back approximately one thousand years. The first Europeans to reach North America were Icelandic Norsemen, who made at least one major effort at settlement in what is today Newfoundland (L'Anse aux Meadows) around 1009 AD. Snorri Þorfinnsson, the son of Þorfinnr Karlsefni and his wife Guðríður, is the first European known to have been born in the New World. 

In 1875, over 200 Icelanders immigrated to Manitoba establishing the New Iceland colony along the west shore of Lake Winnipeg in Manitoba, this is the first part of a large wave of immigrants who settled on the Canadian prairies.

According to historian Gunnar Karlsson, "migration from Iceland is unique in that most went to Canada, whereas from most or all other European countries the majority went to the United States. This was partly due to the late beginning of emigration from Iceland after the Canadian authorities had begun to promote emigration in cooperation with the Allan Line, which already had an agent in Iceland in 1873. Contrary to most European countries, this promotion campaign was successful in Iceland, because emigration was only just about to start from there and Icelandic emigrants had no relatives in the United States to help them take the first steps".

1,245 Icelanders, Icelandic Americans and Icelandic Canadians were registered as soldiers during World War I. 989 fought for Canada whereas 256 fought for the United States. 391 of the combatants were born in Iceland, the rest were of Icelandic descent. 10 women of Icelandic descent and 4 women born in Iceland served as nurses during World War I. At least 144 of the combatants died during World War I (96 in combat, 19 from wounds suffered during combat, 2 from accidents, and 27 from disease), 61 of them were born in Iceland. Ten men were taken as prisoners of war by the Germans.

Icelandic population in Canada 
The provinces with the most reported Icelandic-Canadians in 2016 are:

Communities 

Gimli, Manitoba, has a high concentration of Icelanders, with 26% of the city population, and 20% of the metro population claiming Icelandic ancestry.

Settlements in Canada which are notably Icelandic by foundation or ethnicity:

 Markerville, Alberta
 Arborg, Manitoba
 Baldur, Manitoba
 Elfros, Saskatchewan
 Erickson, Manitoba
 Glenboro, Manitoba
 Lakeview, Manitoba
 Lundar, Manitoba
 Morden, Manitoba
 New Iceland
 Riverton, Manitoba
 Reykjavik, Manitoba
 Wynyard, Saskatchewan
 Kinmount, Ontario

Culture

Naming customs 
Notably, Icelandic Canadians do not typically follow traditional Icelandic naming customs, by which people do not have surnames but are instead distinguished by the use of a parent's given name as a patronymic; instead, Icelandic immigrants to Canada have largely adapted to North American customs by adopting a true surname. Icelandic surnames in Canada most commonly represent the patronymic of the person's first ancestor to settle in Canada, although they may also sometimes be chosen to represent the family's ancestral village in Iceland rather than the name of an individual ancestor.

Notable Icelandic Canadians

See also

 Winnipeg Falcons
 European Canadians
 Norwegian Canadians
 Swedish Canadians
 Danish Canadians
 Dutch Canadians
 Flemish Canadians

References

Bibliography

 Boultbee, Paul G., "Icelandic-Canadian bibliography", Canadian Ethnic Studies. 29(3):82-94, 1997.

External links
 Icelandic Immigration to Canada 1887

 
European Canadian
 
Icelandic diaspora